The first USS Cummings (DD-44) was a  used by the United States Navy during World War I. She was later transferred to the United States Coast Guard, where she was designated CG-3. She was named for Lieutenant Commander Andrew Boyd Cummings.

Cummings was launched on 6 August 1913 by Bath Iron Works, Bath, Maine; sponsored by Mrs. H. Beates, Jr., niece of Lieutenant Commander Cummings; and commissioned on 19 September 1913.

Pre-World War I
Departing Boston in November 1913, Cummings cruised along the Atlantic coast and in the Caribbean until the following June, when she joined the Neutrality Patrol and cruised off the coast until the United States entered into World War I.

World War I
Arriving at New York Navy Yard on 12 May 1917 to be outfitted for foreign service, Cummings sailed on 15 May, reaching the Destroyer Base, Queenstown, Ireland on 26 May. She was commanded by the future admiral, Henry Kent Hewitt. She served in the cross-channel escort service under Commander, US Naval Forces Operating in European Waters, and also conducted anti-submarine patrols off the southern Irish coast, making contact in 14 encounters. The ship continued to serve on escort assignments off the coast of France after the war.

Inter-war period
Cummings departed French waters on 16 December 1918, and from 6–9 April 1919 she joined in destroyer maneuvers and gunnery exercises at Guantanamo Bay. In July and August, she operated off Newport, and then was in reserve at Philadelphia from August 1919-March 1921. She returned to operations off the east coast with the Fleet until placed out of commission in Philadelphia on 23 June 1922.

Transferred to the Treasury Department for the Coast Guard on 6 June 1924, Cummings served as part of the Rum Patrol. She was based in New London, Connecticut until transferred to Stapleton, New York in 1931.

Cummings was returned to the Navy on 23 May 1932 and sold on 22 August 1934 for scrapping in accordance with the London Naval Treaty.

References

External links

 

Cassin-class destroyers
World War I destroyers of the United States
Ships built in Bath, Maine
1913 ships